Rebecca Walker is a writer.

Rebecca or Becky Walker may also refer to:

Rebecca Walker (politician)
Rebecca Walker (Geordie Shore)
Sweet Becky Walker, song